Eric Oscroft (20 April 1933 – 8 November 2013) was an English cricketer.  Oscroft was a right-handed batsman who bowled left-arm fast-medium.  He was born at Sutton-in-Ashfield, Nottinghamshire.

Oscroft made his first-class debut for Nottinghamshire against Warwickshire at Trent Bridge in the 1950 County Championship.  He made eight further first-class appearances for the county, the last of which came against Surrey at The Oval in the 1951 County Championship. In his nine first-class appearances for Nottinghamshire, he took 13 wickets at an average of 54.38, with best figures of 4/88.  With the bat, he scored a total of 8 runs at an average of 1.60, with a high score of 7 not out.

References

External links
Eric Oscroft at ESPNcricinfo
 at CricketArchive

1933 births
2013 deaths
Cricketers from Sutton-in-Ashfield
English cricketers
Nottinghamshire cricketers